Sir John Balfour GCMG, GBE (1894–1983) was a British diplomat.

Family
Sir John was the son of the Conservative politician Charles Balfour, and the maternal grandson of the 5th Earl of Antrim. In 1933, he married Frances van Millingen, daughter of Professor Alexander van Millingen of Robert College, Constantinople, although their marriage remained childless.

World War 1
Balfour was an Oxford student studying German in the city of Freiberg when World War I began. He spent the entire war in Ruhleben internment camp.

Diplomatic career
During his service with the Foreign Office, Balfour was posted to Portugal, Spain (1951–1954), Argentina, Moscow, and Washington DC. A hispanophile, Balfour was an ardent opponent of Francisco Franco's regime.

In 1983, Balfour published his memoirs, Not Too Correct an Aureole: Recollections of a Diplomat.

References

1894 births
1983 deaths
Ambassadors of the United Kingdom to Spain
Knights Grand Cross of the Order of St Michael and St George
Knights Grand Cross of the Order of the British Empire
John, diplomat